Maddy Proud (born 4 December 1993), also known as Madeleine Proud, is an Australian netball player. Between 2011 and 2016, Proud played for Adelaide Thunderbirds in the ANZ Championship. Since 2017, she has played for New South Wales Swifts in Suncorp Super Netball. She captained the Swifts team that won the 2019 Suncorp Super Netball title. She has also represented Australia at under-21 and Fast5 level.

Early life and education
Proud was born and raised in Adelaide. Between 2009 and 2011 she attended Sacred Heart College.
Between 2012 and 2016 she attended the University of South Australia where she gained a Bachelor of Management in Marketing. Between 2018 and 2020 she attended Macquarie University where she completed a Masters of Creative Writing.

Playing career

Early years
In her youth, Proud played for Contax and the South Australian Sports Institute. She also represented South Australia at under-17 level.

Adelaide Thunderbirds
Between 2011 and 2016, Proud played for Adelaide Thunderbirds in the ANZ Championship. She was 16 when she joined Thunderbirds. During the 2012 season, Proud also played for Southern Force in the Australian Netball League. She was a member of the Force team that finished as ANL Champions. During the 2013 season, she played with the Australian Institute of Sport.

New South Wales Swifts
Since 2017, Proud has played for New South Wales Swifts in Suncorp Super Netball. In 2017 Proud was named both QBE NSW Swifts MVP and the NSW Swifts Members' Player of the Year. Proud captained the New South Wales Institute of Sport team that finished third in the 2017 Netball New Zealand Super Club tournament. In February 2019 Proud was appointed captain of Swifts. She captained the Swifts team that won the 2019 Suncorp Super Netball title, but missed the second half of the season because of injury. She was re-appointed Swifts' captain for both the 2020 and 2021 seasons.

Australia
Proud has represented Australia at under-21 and Fast5 level. In 2012 she was named the Australian Under-21 Team Player of the Year. She captained Australia at the 2013 Netball World Youth Cup She was included in the senior Australia squad for 2020–21.

Children's writer
In January 2018 Proud became a published children's author after she released Grace on the Court, a book chronicling the life of a 13-year-old netball player in her first year at high school.

Honours
New South Wales Swifts
Suncorp Super Netball
Winners: 2019
Southern Force
Australian Netball League
Winners: 2012
Individual
QBE NSW Swifts MVP
Winner: 2017 
NSW Swifts Members' Player of the Year
Winner: 2017

References

External links

Living people
1993 births
Australian netball players
Australia international Fast5 players
Netball players from South Australia
Contax Netball Club players
Australian Institute of Sport netball players
South Australian Sports Institute netball players
New South Wales Institute of Sport netball players
Adelaide Thunderbirds players
Southern Force (netball) players
New South Wales Swifts players
ANZ Championship players
Suncorp Super Netball players
Australian Netball League players
Australian writers of young adult literature
Australian women children's writers
University of South Australia alumni
Macquarie University alumni
People educated at Sacred Heart College, Adelaide
New South Wales state netball league players